Corey Edward Widmer (born December 25, 1968 in Alexandria, Virginia) is a former American football linebacker who played his entire eight-year career in the National Football League with the New York Giants.  He was drafted in the seventh round of the 1992 NFL Draft by the Giants out of Montana State University; which is in Bozeman, where he was also raised.

In 2007, he suffered a severe back injury while paragliding in Chile.

See also
History of the New York Giants (1994-present)

References

External links
Football database

Living people
1968 births
American football linebackers
New York Giants players
Montana State Bobcats football players